The 12th Slavonia Assault Division was a Yugoslav Partisan division formed on 30 December 1942. Upon formation it consisted of the 12th Slavonia Brigade, the 16th Youth Brigade and the 17th Slavonia Brigade with total of around 2700 soldiers. On 17 May 1943 it became a part of the 6th Corps. It operated mostly in the Slavonia region. During the war the division lost two if its commanders: Nikola Demonja and Milan Stanivuković.

Notes

References 

Divisions of the Yugoslav Partisans
Military units and formations established in 1942